The 1986 Winnipeg Blue Bombers finished in 3rd place in the West Division with an 11–7 record. They played in the West Semi-Final but lost to the BC Lions.

Offseason

CFL Draft

Preseason

† June 7, 1986, game against Montreal was played at Canada Games Stadium in Saint John, New Brunswick.

Regular season

Standings

Schedule

Playoffs

West Semi-Final

Awards

1986 CFL All-Stars

References

Winnipeg Blue Bombers seasons
1986 Canadian Football League season by team